Ben Honeyman (born 14 February 1977 in Adelaide) is a former Australian football (soccer) player who currently plays cricket for Glenrothes Cricket Club.

Football career
Honeyman began his career with Dundee United but made just two appearances, scoring on his début in the 1–0 Scottish Challenge Cup quarter-final away win over Clydebank in September 1995 and appearing as a substitute in the league defeat at Dumbarton eleven days later. Honeyman failed to appear in another matchday squad and began the following season with Forfar Athletic, where he stayed for three years. After a short spell at East Fife in 1999, Honeyman spent three years with Brechin City, where he finished his senior career in 2002. Following this, Honeyman spent time in junior football, earning a player/manager role with Arniston Rangers, which made him the league's youngest manager at 28 years old.

Cricket career
In 2006, Honeyman turned his back on football and began playing cricket in Fife for Glenrothes, being appointed captain at the start of the 2008 season.

Career statistics

References

External links 
 

1977 births
Living people
Soccer players from Adelaide
Australian soccer players
Australian expatriate soccer players
Scottish Football League players
Brechin City F.C. players
Dundee United F.C. players
East Fife F.C. players
Forfar Athletic F.C. players
Arniston Rangers F.C. players
Association football forwards
Expatriate footballers in Scotland
Arniston Rangers F.C. managers